Volume Five, Volume 5, Volume V can represent:

 Volume 5: Anatomic
 Volume Five, an album published by Volume magazine
Jock Jams, Volume 5
Volume 5: Poetry for the Masses (SeaShedShitheadByTheSheSore) The Desert Sessions
On Broadway Volume 5

See also